

Summer Olympics 
 July 25 – August 3 Postponed: Badminton at the 2020 Summer Olympics in  Tokyo
 Men's singles:
   Viktor Axelsen
   Chen Long
   Anthony Sinisuka Ginting
 Women's singles:
   Chen Yufei
   Tai Tzu-ying
   P.V.Sindhu
 Men's doubles:
   (Lee Yang & Wang Chi-lin)
   (Li Junhui & Liu Yuchen)
   (Aaron Chia & Soh Wooi Yik)
 Women's doubles:
   (Greysia Polii & Apriyani Rahayu)
   (Chen Qingchen & Jia Yifan)
   (Kim So-yeong & Kong Hee-yong)
 Mixed doubles:
   (Wang Yilyu & Huang Dongping)
   (Zheng Siwei & Huang Yaqiong)
   (Yuta Watanabe & Arisa Higashino)

Summer Paralympics 
 September 2 – 6 Postponed: Badminton at the 2020 Summer Paralympics (debut event) in  Tokyo
 Men's singles:
   
   
   
 Women's singles:
   
   
   
 Men's doubles:
  
  
  
 Women's doubles:
  
  
  
 Mixed doubles:

International badminton events (Grade 1) 
 August 15 – 23: 2020 Thomas & Uber Cup in  Aarhus
 Thomas Cup winners: Indonesia 
 Uber Cup winners: China 

 September 28 – October 11: 2020 BWF World Junior Championships in  Auckland
 Singles:   (m) /   (f)
 Doubles:  ( & ) (m) /  ( & ) (f)
 Mixed:  ( & )
 Team:

Continental badminton events 
 February 10 – 15: 2020 Oceania Badminton Championships (Senior & Teams) in  Ballarat
 Singles:  Abhinav Manota (m) /  Chen Hsuan-yu (f)
 Doubles:  (Oliver Leydon-Davis & Abhinav Manota) (m) /  (Setyana Mapasa & Gronya Somerville) (f)
 Mixed:  (Simon Leung & Gronya Somerville)
 Men's team:  (Anthony Joe, Jacbo Schueler, Keith Mark Edison, Lin Ying Xiang, Matthew Chau, Mitchell Wheller, Sawan Serasinghe, Simon Leung)
 Women's team:   (Angela Yu, Chen Hsuan-yu, Gronya Somerville, Kaitlyn Ea, Louisa Ma, Setyana Mapasa, Sylvina Kurniawan, Tiffany Ho)

 February 10 – 13: 2020 All Africa Men's and Women's Team Badminton Championships in  Cairo
 Men's team:  (Adel Hamek, Koceila Mammeri, Mohamed Abderrahime Belarbi, Youcef Sabri Medel)
 Women's team:   (Doha Hany, Hadia Hosny, Hana Tarek Mohamed, Jana Ashraf, Nour Ahmed Youssri, Rahma Mohamed Saad Eladawy)

 February 10 – 13: 2020 African Badminton Championships in  Cairo
 Singles:  Georges Paul (m) /  Kate Foo Kune (f)
 Doubles:  (Koceila Mammeri & Youcef Sabri Medel) (m) /  (Doha Hany & Hadia Hosny) (f)
 Mixed:  (Adham Hatem Elgamal & Doha Hany)

 February 11 – 16: 2020 European Men's and Women's Team Badminton Championships in  Liévin
 Men's team:  (Anders Antonsen, Anders Skaarup Rasmussen, Carsten Mogensen, Frederik Søgaard, Hans-Kristian Vittinghus, Jan Ø. Jørgensen, Kim Astrup, Mads Conrad-Petersen, Mathias Boe, Viktor Axelsen)
 Women's team:  (Alexandra Bøje, Amalie Magelund, Freja Ravn, Julie Dawall Jakobsen, Line Christophersen, Line Kjærsfeldt, Maiken Fruergaard, Mette Poulsen, Mia Blichfeldt, Sara Thygesen)

 February 11 – 16: 2020 Badminton Asia Team Championships in  Manila
 Men's team:  (Anthony Sinisuka Ginting, Fajar Alfian, Firman Abdul Kholik, Hendra Setiawan, Jonatan Christie, Kevin Sanjaya Sukamuljo, Marcus Fernaldi Gideon, Mohammad Ahsan, Muhammad Rian Ardianto, Shesar Hiren Rhustavito)
 Women's team:  (Akane Yamaguchi, Aya Ohori, Chiharu Shida, Mayu Matsumoto, Nami Matsuyama, Riko Gunji, Sayaka Hirota, Sayaka Takahashi, Wakana Nagahara, Yuki Fukushima)

 February 13 – 16: 2020 Pan Am Badminton Team Championships in  Salvador
 Men's team:  (Antonio Li, Brian Yang, Jason Ho-shue, Joshua Hurlburt-Yu, Maxime Tétreault, Nyl Yakura, Phillipe Charron)
 Women's team:  (Brittney Tam, Catherine Choi, Jacqueline Cheung, Kyleigh O'Donoghue, Kristen Tsai, Michelle Li, Rachel Honderich, Zhang Wen Yu)

 April 21 – 26: 2020 European Badminton Championships in  Kyiv
 Singles:   (m) /   (f)
 Doubles:  ( & ) (m) /  ( & ) (f)
 Mixed:  ( & )

 April 21 – 26: 2020 Badminton Asia Championships in  Manila
 Singles:   (m) /   (f)
 Doubles:  ( & ) (m) /  ( & ) (f)
 Mixed:  ( & )

 April 23 – 26: 2020 Pan Am Badminton Championships in  Guatemala City
 Singles:   (m) /   (f)
 Doubles:  ( & ) (m) /  ( & ) (f)
 Mixed:  ( & )

 July 11 – 19: 2020 Badminton Asia Junior Championships in  Suzhou
 Singles:   (m) /   (f)
 Doubles:  ( & ) (m) /  ( & ) (f)
 Mixed:  ( & )
 Team: 

 July 9 – 17: 2020 Pan Am Badminton Junior Championships in  Acapulco
 Singles:   (m) /   (f)
 Doubles:  ( & ) (m) /  ( & ) (f)
 Mixed:  ( & )
 Team: 

 September 25 – 27: 2020 All Africa Badminton Junior Championships in  Cotonou
 Singles:   (m) /   (f)
 Doubles:  ( & ) (m) /  ( & ) (f)
 Mixed:  ( & )

 October 30 – November 8: 2020 European Badminton Junior Championships in  Gliwice
 Singles:   (m) /   (f)
 Doubles:  ( & ) (m) /  ( & ) (f)
 Mixed:  ( & )
 Team: 

 August 3 – 7: 2020 Badminton Asia Senior Championships in  Colombo
 Men's singles: 
 35+:  
 40+:  
 45+:  
 50+:  
 55+:  
 60+:  
 65+:  
 70+:  
 75+:  
 Women's singles: 
 35+:  
 40+:  
 45+:  
 50+:  
 55+:  
 60+:  
 65+:  
 70+:  
 75+:  
 Men's doubles:
 35+:  ( & )
 40+:  ( & )
 45+:  ( & )
 50+:  ( & )
 55+:  ( & )
 60+:  ( & )
 65+:  ( & )
 70+:  ( & )
 75+:  ( & )
 Women's doubles:
 35+:  ( & )
 40+:  ( & )
 45+:  ( & )
 50+:  ( & )
 55+:  ( & )
 60+:  ( & )
 65+:  ( & )
 70+:  ( & )
 75+:  ( & )
 Mixed doubles:
 35+:  ( & )
 40+:  ( & )
 45+:  ( & )
 50+:  ( & )
 55+:  ( & )
 60+:  ( & )
 65+:  ( & )
 70+:  ( & )
 75+:  ( & )

2020 BWF season (Grade 2) 
 January 7 – December 13: 2020 BWF World Tour

Level 1 (World Tour Finals) 
 December 9 – 13: 2020 BWF World Tour Finals in  Guangzhou
 Singles:   (m) /   (f)
 Doubles:  ( & ) (m) /  ( & ) (f)
 Mixed:  ( & )

Level 2 (Super 1000) 
 March 11 – 15: 2020 All England Open in  Birmingham
 Singles:  Viktor Axelsen (m) /  Tai Tzu-ying (f)
 Doubles:  (Hiroyuki Endo & Yuta Watanabe) (m) /  (Yuki Fukushima & Sayaka Hirota) (f)
 Mixed:  (Praveen Jordan & Melati Daeva Oktavianti)

 June 16 – 21: 2020 Indonesia Open in  Jakarta
 Singles:   (m) /   (f)
 Doubles:  ( & ) (m) /  ( & ) (f)
 Mixed:  ( & )

 September 15 – 20: 2020 China Open in  Changzhou
 Singles:   (m) /   (f)
 Doubles:  ( & ) (m) /  ( & ) (f)
 Mixed:  ( & )

Level 3 (Super 750) 
 March 31 – April 5 Postponed: 2020 Malaysia Open in  Kuala Lumpur
 Singles:   (m) /   (f)
 Doubles:  ( & ) (m) /  ( & ) (f)
 Mixed:  ( & )

 September 22 – 27: 2020 Japan Open in  Tokyo
 Singles:   (m) /   (f)
 Doubles:  ( & ) (m) /  ( & ) (f)
 Mixed:  ( & )

 October 13 – 18: 2020 Denmark Open in  Odense
 Singles:  Anders Antonsen (m) /  Nozomi Okuhara (f)
 Doubles:  (Marcus Ellis & Chris Langridge) (m) /  (Yuki Fukushima & Sayaka Hirota) (f)
 Mixed:  (Mark Lamsfuß & Isabel Herttrich)

 October 20 – 25: 2020 French Open in  Paris
 Singles:   (m) /   (f)
 Doubles:  ( & ) (m) /  ( & ) (f)
 Mixed:  ( & )

 November 3 – 8: 2020 Fuzhou China Open in  Fuzhou
 Singles:   (m) /   (f)
 Doubles:  ( & ) (m) /  ( & ) (f)
 Mixed:  ( & )

Level 4 (Super 500) 
 January 7 – 12: 2020 Malaysia Masters in  Kuala Lumpur
 Singles:  Kento Momota (m) /  Chen Yufei (f)
 Doubles:  (Kim Gi-jung & Lee Yong-dae) (m) /  (Li Wenmei & Zheng Yu) (f)
 Mixed:  (Zheng Siwei & Huang Yaqiong)

 January 14 – 21: 2020 Indonesia Masters in  Jakarta
 Singles:  Anthony Sinisuka Ginting (m) /  Ratchanok Intanon (f)
 Doubles:  (Marcus Fernaldi Gideon & Kevin Sanjaya Sukamuljo) (m) /  (Greysia Polii & Apriyani Rahayu) (f)
 Mixed:  (Zheng Siwei & Huang Yaqiong)

 March 24 – 29 Postponed: 2020 India Open in  New Delhi
 Singles:   (m) /   (f)
 Doubles:  ( & ) (m) /  ( & ) (f)
 Mixed:  ( & )

 April 7 – 12 Postponed: 2020 Singapore Open in  Singapore
 Singles:   (m) /   (f)
 Doubles:  ( & ) (m) /  ( & ) (f)
 Mixed:  ( & )

 June 9 – 14: 2020 Thailand Open in  Bangkok
 Singles:   (m) /   (f)
 Doubles:  ( & ) (m) /  ( & ) (f)
 Mixed:  ( & )

 September 8 – 13: 2020 Korea Open in  Seoul
 Singles:   (m) /   (f)
 Doubles:  ( & ) (m) /  ( & ) (f)
 Mixed:  ( & )

 November 10 – 15: 2020 Hong Kong Open in  Hong Kong
 Singles:   (m) /   (f)
 Doubles:  ( & ) (m) /  ( & ) (f)
 Mixed:  ( & )

Level 5 (Super 300) 
 January 21 – 26: 2020 Thailand Masters in  Bangkok
 Singles:  Ng Ka Long (m) /  Akane Yamaguchi (f)
 Doubles:  (Ong Yew Sin & Teo Ee Yi) (m) /  (Chen Qingchen & Jia Yifan) (f)
 Mixed:  (Marcus Ellis & Lauren Smith)

 February 18 – 23: 2020 Spain Masters in  Barcelona
 Singles:  Viktor Axelsen (m) /  Pornpawee Chochuwong (f)
 Doubles:  (Kim Astrup & Anders Skaarup Rasmussen) (m) /  (Greysia Polii & Apriyani Rahayu) (f)
 Mixed:  (Kim Sa-rang & Kim Ha-na)

 March 3 – 8 Postponed: 2020 German Open in  Mülheim
 Singles:   (m) /   (f)
 Doubles:  ( & ) (m) /  ( & ) (f)
 Mixed:  ( & )

 March 17 – 22 Postponed: 2020 Swiss Open in  Basel
 Singles:   (m) /   (f)
 Doubles:  ( & ) (m) /  ( & ) (f)
 Mixed:  ( & )

 April 28 – May 3 Postponed: 2020 New Zealand Open in  Auckland
 Singles:   (m) /   (f)
 Doubles:  ( & ) (m) /  ( & ) (f)
 Mixed:  ( & )

 June 2 – 7: 2020 Australian Open in  Sydney
 Singles:   (m) /   (f)
 Doubles:  ( & ) (m) /  ( & ) (f)
 Mixed:  ( & )

 June 23 – 28: 2020 U.S. Open in  California
 Singles:   (m) /   (f)
 Doubles:  ( & ) (m) /  ( & ) (f)
 Mixed:  ( & )

 September 1 – 6: 2020 Chinese Taipei Open in  Taipei
 Singles:   (m) /   (f)
 Doubles:  ( & ) (m) /  ( & ) (f)
 Mixed:  ( & )

 October 27 – November 1: 2020 Macau Open in  Macau
 Singles:   (m) /   (f)
 Doubles:  ( & ) (m) /  ( & ) (f)
 Mixed:  ( & )

 November 17 – 22: 2020 Syed Modi International in  Lucknow
 Singles:   (m) /   (f)
 Doubles:  ( & ) (m) /  ( & ) (f)
 Mixed:  ( & )

 November 24 – 29: 2020 Korea Masters in  Gwangju
 Singles:   (m) /   (f)
 Doubles:  ( & ) (m) /  ( & ) (f)
 Mixed:  ( & )

Level 6 (Super 100) 
 February 25 – March 1 Postponed: 2020 Lingshui China Masters in  Lingshui
 Singles:   (m) /   (f)
 Doubles:  ( & ) (m) /  ( & ) (f)
 Mixed:  ( & )

 March 24 – 29 Postponed: 2020 Orléans Masters in  Orléans
 Singles:   (m) /   (f)
 Doubles:  ( & ) (m) /  ( & ) (f)
 Mixed:  ( & )

 June 30 – July 5: 2020 Canada Open in  Calgary
 Singles:   (m) /   (f)
 Doubles:  ( & ) (m) /  ( & ) (f)
 Mixed:  ( & )

 July 7 – 12: 2020 Russian Open in  Vladivostok
 Singles:   (m) /   (f)
 Doubles:  ( & ) (m) /  ( & ) (f)
 Mixed:  ( & )

 July 28 – August 2: 2020 Hyderabad Open in  Hyderabad
 Singles:   (m) /   (f)
 Doubles:  ( & ) (m) /  ( & ) (f)
 Mixed:  ( & )

 August 18 – 23: 2020 Akita Masters in  Akita
 Singles:   (m) /   (f)
 Doubles:  ( & ) (m) /  ( & ) (f)
 Mixed:  ( & )

 August 25 – 30: 2020 Vietnam Open in  Da Nang
 Singles:   (m) /   (f)
 Doubles:  ( & ) (m) /  ( & ) (f)
 Mixed:  ( & )

 Singles:   (m) /   (f)
 Doubles:  ( & ) (m) /  ( & ) (f)
 Mixed:  ( & )

 October 6 – 11: 2020 Dutch Open in  Almere
 Singles:   (m) /   (f)
 Doubles:  ( & ) (m) /  ( & ) (f)
 Mixed:  ( & )

 October 27 – November 1: 2020 SaarLorLux Open in  Saarbrücken
 Singles:  Toma Junior Popov (m) /  Kirsty Gilmour (f)
 Doubles:  (Jeppe Bay & Lasse Mølhede) (m) /  (Gabriela Stoeva & Stefani Stoeva) (f)
 Mixed:  (Mathias Christiansen & Alexandra Bøje)

Leagues 
 January 20 – February 9: 2020 Premier Badminton League in 
 The Bengaluru Raptors defeated the Northeastern Warriors, 4–2, to win their second Premier Badminton League title.
 Player of the League:  Tai Tzu-ying of Bengaluru Raptors
 Indian Player of the League:  N. Sikki Reddy of Hyderabad Hunters
 Emerging Player of the League:  Priyanshu Rajawat of Hyderabad Hunters

World University Championships 
 November 16 – 22: 2020 World University Badminton Championships in  Bangkok
 Singles:   (m) /   (f)
 Doubles:  ( & ) (m) /  ( & ) (f)
 Mixed:  ( & )
 Team:

References

 
Badminton by year
Badminton